For the state pageant affiliated with Miss Teen USA, see Miss North Dakota Teen USA

The Miss North Dakota's Outstanding Teen competition is the pageant that selects the representative for the U.S. state of North Dakota in the Miss America's Outstanding Teen pageant.

Olivia Rossland of Williston was crowned Miss North Dakota's Outstanding Teen on June 10, 2022 at the Bakken Auditorium in Williston, North Dakota. She competed for the title of Miss America's Outstanding Teen 2023 at the Hyatt Regency Dallas in Dallas, Texas on August 12, 2022.

Results summary 
The year in parentheses indicates year of Miss America's Outstanding Teen competition the award/placement was garnered.

Placements 

 Top 8: Abby Wolfe (2014)
 Top 12: Raghen Lucy (2015)

Awards

Preliminary awards 
 Preliminary Evening Wear/On-Stage Question: Arianna Walker (2009)
 Preliminary Talent: Raghen Lucy (2015)

Non-finalist awards 
 Non-finalist Evening Wear/On-Stage Question: Arianna Walker (2009)
 Non-finalist Interview: Arianna Walker (2009)

Other awards 
 America's Choice: Raghen Lucy (2015)
 Outstanding Instrumental Talent Award: Raghen Lucy (2015)
 Random Acts of Kindness Award: Micah Schlittenhardt (2019)
 Teens in Action Award Finalist: Lyndsey Scheurer (2017)

Winners

References

External links
  Official website

North Dakota
North Dakota culture
Women in North Dakota